Domenic Amodeo (born March 6, 1968 in Toronto, Canada) is a Canadian former professional ice hockey player. He played in the minor leagues and throughout Europe.

Career
Amodeo began his collegiate career in 1988 with the New Hampshire Wildcats. During his time in the Hockey East he was a prolific scorer, registering 167 points in 142 games over the four years he was with the program. In his senior year, Amodeo was named as both a Second Team All-American and a member of the Hockey East All-Tournament Team.

Upon graduating, Amodeo signed a professional contract with the Canadian National Team, who, at the time, played exhibition games across North America. The following season, Amodeo signed with the NHL's Boston Bruins, who assigned him to their AHL affiliate team, the Providence Bruins. He was only in Providence for 3 games however, before being reassigned to the Charlotte Checkers. Amodeo subsequently moved to Europe in order to play for Italian Serie A outfit HC Asiago. He remained in Italy the following season, playing for Como in Serie B where he had a career year. The following season, Amodeo moved to German 1st Liga 1. EV Weiden. Amodeo moved to Switzerland for the 1997–98 season, playing for Grasshopper Club Zurich of the NLB. He remained with the team the following season, before moving to HC Thurgau, also of the NLB for the 1999–00 season. He returned to Serie A the following season, with HC Merano.

The 2001-02 saw Amodeo begin with EHC Basel Dragons as injury cover for Steve Potvin who was out with a broken foot. Upon Potvin's return to the line up, Amodeo moved to the United Kingdom in order to play for the London Knights of the BISL, joining the team of transfer deadline day. Following the culmination of the British season, Amodeo retired from professional hockey.

Awards and achievements
 NCAA (East) Second All-American Team (1992)
 NCAA (Hockey East) All-Tournament Team (1992)

Career statistics

Regular season and play-offs

International

Post-playing career
Amodeo now runs the Olympic Hockey Academy, and has worked with several NHL players, including Robby Fabbri, and Ryan Strome.

References

Notes

External links
 

1968 births
Living people
Asiago Hockey 1935 players
Canadian ice hockey left wingers
Canadian sportspeople of Italian descent
Canadian expatriate ice hockey players in Austria
Canadian expatriate ice hockey players in England
Canadian expatriate ice hockey players in Germany
Canadian expatriate ice hockey players in Italy
Canadian expatriate ice hockey players in Switzerland
Canadian expatriate ice hockey players in the United States
Charlotte Checkers (1993–2010) players
EHC Basel players
GCK Lions players
HC Merano players
HC Thurgau players
Ice Hockey Superleague players
Ice hockey people from Ontario
London Knights (UK) players
New Hampshire Wildcats men's ice hockey players
Providence Bruins players
AHCA Division I men's ice hockey All-Americans